Sanfilippo is a surname. Notable people with the surname include:

 Bruno Sanfilippo, musician and producer
 Federica Sanfilippo (born 1990), Italian biathlete
 Frank Sanfilippo (born 1981), American soccer player
 Fred Sanfilippo, executive vice president for health affairs at Emory University
 Jasper Sanfilippo, an American businessman, also associated with the Place de la Musique
 José Sanfilippo (born 1935), Argentine footballer
 Salvatore Sanfilippo (born 1977), author of Redis and hping, also invented Idle scan.
 Sylvester Sanfilippo, an American pediatrician who discovered the Sanfilippo syndrome
 Tom SanFilippo, guitarist for the music group The Vagrants
 Tony SanFilippo, musician who co-produced the album Vagabonds and Hooligans

See also
 Sanfilippo syndrome, a rare disease
 Sanfilippo Place de la Musique, a private museum near Chicago, Illinois
 San Filippo (disambiguation)